Ei Iida and Maya Kidowaki were the defending champions but only Iida competed that year with Kyoko Nagatsuka.

Iida and Nagatsuka lost in the quarterfinals to Yayuk Basuki and Nana Miyagi.

Mami Donoshiro and Ai Sugiyama won in the final 6–4, 6–1 against Basuki and Miyagi.

Seeds
Champion seeds are indicated in bold text while text in italics indicates the round in which those seeds were eliminated.

 Jenny Byrne /  Rachel McQuillan (quarterfinals)
 Yayuk Basuki /  Nana Miyagi (final)
 Linda Harvey-Wild /  Kristine Radford (first round)
 Sabine Appelmans /  Florencia Labat (first round)

Draw

External links
 1994 Japan Open Tennis Championships Women's Doubles Draw

Doubles